The 2018–19 season was Al-Qadsiah's fourth consecutive season in the Pro League and 52nd year in their existence. Along with competing in the Pro League, the club also participated in the King Cup.

The season covers the period from 1 July 2018 to 30 June 2019.

Players

Squad information

Out on loan

Transfers

In

Loans in

Out

Loans out

Competitions

Overall

Last Updated: 16 May 2019

Saudi Pro League

League table

Results summary

Results by round

Matches
All times are local, AST (UTC+3).

King Cup

All times are local, AST (UTC+3).

Statistics

Squad statistics
As of 16 May 2019.

|-
! colspan=16 style=background:#dcdcdc; text-align:center|Goalkeepers

|-
! colspan=16 style=background:#dcdcdc; text-align:center|Defenders

|-
! colspan=16 style=background:#dcdcdc; text-align:center|Midfielders

|-
! colspan=16 style=background:#dcdcdc; text-align:center|Forwards

|-
! colspan=14 style=background:#dcdcdc; text-align:center| Players sent out on loan this season

|-
! colspan=14 style=background:#dcdcdc; text-align:center| Player who made an appearance this season but have left the club

|}

Goalscorers

Last Updated: 16 May 2019

Assists

Last Updated: 16 May 2019

Clean sheets

Last Updated: 1 March 2019

References

Al-Qadisiyah FC seasons
Qadsiah